Mohammad Hussamuddin (born 12 February 1994) is an Indian boxer. He won a bronze medal in the first India International Open boxing championship in New Delhi. He competes in 56 kilogram category.  Hussamuddin won a Bronze at the 2018 Commonwealth Games held at Gold Coast in Queensland, Australia. In the 2022 Birmingham Commonwealth Games, he claimed the bronze medal in the Men’s 57kg Featherweight category

Life
He was born in Nizamabad, Telangana to boxer, Samsamuddin. His father and brothers, Ahteshamuddin and Aitesamuddin, represented India at international boxing events.

References

People from Nizamabad, Telangana
1996 births
Living people
Indian male boxers
Boxers from Telangana
Boxers at the 2018 Commonwealth Games
Boxers at the 2022 Commonwealth Games
Commonwealth Games medallists in boxing
Commonwealth Games bronze medallists for India
Boxers at the 2018 Asian Games
Asian Games competitors for India
Bantamweight boxers
21st-century Indian people
Medallists at the 2018 Commonwealth Games
Medallists at the 2022 Commonwealth Games